Telegraph Media Group Limited (TMG; previously the Telegraph Group) is the proprietor of The Daily Telegraph and The Sunday Telegraph. It is a subsidiary of Press Holdings. David and Frederick Barclay acquired the group on 30 July 2004, after months of intense bidding and lawsuits, from Hollinger Inc. of Toronto, Canada, the newspaper group controlled by the Canadian/American businessman Conrad Black.

In 2015, TMG made an operating profit of £51 million. Profits before tax were £47m, and turnover for the 53 weeks up to 3 January 2016 was £319m, according to unaudited accounts leaked to The Guardian. If these figures are accurate, then this was an increase from 2014 levels on both accounts.

Telegraph Media Group operates as a multimedia news company. The holding publishes daily and weekly publications in printed and electronic versions, which provide news on politics, obituaries, sports, finance, lifestyle, travel, health, culture, technology, fashion and cars.

Team 

 Nick Hugh is the CEO.
 Cormac O’Shea is the CFO.
 Chris Taylor is the COO.
 Sarah Crompton is the editor-in-chief of the Daily Telegraph's art department.
 Jim Freeman is the sales director.
 Matthew Watkins is Director of Alert Strategy.

References

External links
 

 
Publishing companies established in 1948
Newspaper companies of the United Kingdom
1948 establishments in the United Kingdom